Parliamentary elections were held in Niger on 22 October 1970. The country was a one-party state at the time, with the Nigerien Progressive Party – African Democratic Rally as the sole legal party. It therefore won all 50 seats in the National Assembly. Voter turnout was 97.1%.

Results

References

Niger
1970 in Niger
Elections in Niger
One-party elections